The Mawddach Group is a middle to upper Cambrian lithostratigraphic group (a sequence of rock strata) in Gwynedd, Wales. The name is derived from the river known as the Afon Mawddach.

Outcrops
The rocks are exposed across the Harlech Dome and southern Snowdonia.

Lithology and stratigraphy
The Group comprises around 2400m thickness of  mudstones, sandstones and siltstones laid down in the marine Welsh Basin during the middle to late Cambrian period. The Group comprises (in descending order i.e. oldest last) the Dol-cyn-Afon Formation, the Dolgellau Formation, the Ffestiniog Flags Formation, the Maentwrog Formation and the Clogau Formation.

References

Cambrian System of Europe
Geology of Wales
Geologic formations of the United Kingdom